In mathematics, certain systems of partial differential equations are usefully formulated, from the point of view of their underlying geometric and algebraic structure, in terms of a system of differential forms. The idea is to take advantage of the way a differential form restricts to a submanifold, and the fact that this restriction is compatible with the exterior derivative. This is one possible approach to certain over-determined systems, for example, including Lax pairs of integrable systems. A Pfaffian system is specified by 1-forms alone, but the theory includes other types of example of differential system. To elaborate, a Pfaffian system is a set of 1-forms on a smooth manifold (which one sets equal to 0 to find solutions to the system).

Given a collection of differential 1-forms  on an -dimensional manifold ,  an integral manifold is an immersed (not necessarily embedded) submanifold whose tangent space at every point  is annihilated by (the pullback of) each .

A maximal integral manifold is an immersed (not necessarily embedded) submanifold

such that the kernel of the restriction map on forms

A Pfaffian system is said to be completely integrable if  admits a foliation by maximal integral manifolds. (Note that the foliation need not be regular; i.e. the leaves of the foliation might not be embedded submanifolds.)

Necessary and sufficient conditions
The necessary and sufficient conditions for complete integrability of a Pfaffian system are given by the Frobenius theorem.  One version states that if the ideal  algebraically generated by the collection of αi inside the ring Ω(M) is differentially closed, in other words

then the system admits a foliation by maximal integral manifolds. (The converse is obvious from the definitions.)

Example of a non-integrable system
Not every Pfaffian system  is completely integrable in the Frobenius sense. For example, consider the following one-form :

If dθ were in the ideal generated by θ we would have, by the skewness of the wedge product

But a direct calculation gives

which is a nonzero multiple of the standard volume form on R3.  Therefore, there are no two-dimensional leaves, and the system is not completely integrable.

On the other hand, for the curve defined by

then θ defined as above is 0, and hence the curve is easily verified to be a solution (i.e. an integral curve) for the above Pfaffian system for any nonzero constant c.

Examples of applications
By the Poincaré lemma, the θi locally will have the form dxi for some functions xi on the manifold, and thus provide an isometry of an open subset of M with an open subset of Rn. Such a manifold is called locally flat.

This problem reduces to a question on the coframe bundle of M.  Suppose we had such a closed coframe

If we had another coframe , then the two coframes would be related by an orthogonal transformation

If the connection 1-form is ω, then we have

On the other hand,
 

But  is the Maurer–Cartan form for the orthogonal group.  Therefore, it obeys the structural equation
 and this is just the curvature of M: 
After an application of the Frobenius theorem, one concludes that a manifold M is locally flat if and only if its curvature vanishes.

Generalizations
Many generalizations exist to integrability conditions on differential systems which are not necessarily generated by one-forms.  The most famous of these are the Cartan–Kähler theorem, which only works for real analytic differential systems, and the Cartan–Kuranishi prolongation theorem.  See Further reading for details. The Newlander-Nirenberg theorem gives integrability conditions for an almost-complex structure.

Further reading
Bryant, Chern, Gardner, Goldschmidt, Griffiths, Exterior Differential Systems,  Mathematical Sciences Research Institute Publications, Springer-Verlag, 
Olver, P., Equivalence, Invariants, and Symmetry, Cambridge, 
Ivey, T., Landsberg, J.M., Cartan for Beginners: Differential Geometry via Moving Frames and Exterior Differential Systems, American Mathematical Society, 
Dunajski, M., Solitons, Instantons and Twistors, Oxford University Press, 

Partial differential equations
Differential topology
Differential systems